The Historic Jefferson Railway (sometimes known as the Jefferson and Cypress Bayou Railway) is a  narrow gauge railroad in Jefferson, Texas.  It is an insular line that follows the Big Cypress Bayou for approximately three miles.  The line is a dog bone way out with loops on each end, joined by a single main track.

Privately owned and operated by DBR Entertainment Inc., it does not depend on any state or federal funding.  The train travels through the piney woods of northeast Texas, a densely forested region of the state.  Along the way, passengers are able to view the location of the first artificial gas plant in the state of Texas, the location of a sawmill and remnants of a blast furnace, and one of only a few remaining Confederate powder magazines from the 1860s. The powder magazine, Jefferson Ordnance Magazine, is listed on the U.S. National Register of Historic Places.
Train excursions take approximately 45 minutes.

History
The railway was constructed in 1985 by the city of Jefferson, which purchased the train set from the defunct Six Gun Territory amusement park in Silver Springs, Florida.  During construction, the train traveled over the completed portion of track and then returned to town in reverse.  Once the final pieces of track were completed, the train no longer had to reverse; it was turned around on the far balloon track.  Also during the late 1980s, a western "town" was constructed along a straightaway halfway down the line.  "Hangtown" was the backdrop for an extensive stunt show, which included multiple shoot-outs.  Eventually, the City of Jefferson could no longer afford to operate the railway, and it was put up for sale.

A series of private owners attempted to resurrect the line, but a combination of factors (including lack of maintenance) caused a complete shut-down by the mid-90s.  By 1999, a local entrepreneur had purchased the train, track, depot, and property in order to keep the riverfront free from development.  Aside from running the train sporadically to keep easement access, the railway remained closed.  During this period, "Hangtown" became neglected and eventually collapsed.

The present owners, a family partnership, acquired the railway in early 2002 .  The intervening years had not been kind to the train or track, and nearly six months of work were required to bring the locomotive boiler up to inspection standards.  During that time, over 1,000 railroad ties were replaced, and the entire line was gauged.  The locomotive's boiler presented a few challenges; in addition to a damaged crown sheet (the critical sheet of metal on top of the firebox) there was no manufacturer's stamp to be found.  A special permit was granted by the state, and the boiler was stamped in the presence of an inspector.  The crown sheet was replaced, and the locomotive was once again certified by the State of Texas.

The ribbon-cutting ceremony occurred during Labor Day weekend, 2002.  The first public runs in years were deemed successful, with attendance in the hundreds.

Scenery
Roughly 90% of the trip is along the Big Cypress Bayou, affording views of the slow-moving water and thousands of bald cypress trees. Magnolia, sweetgum, pine, oak, maple, redbud, and dogwood trees line the track, with the train under the forest canopy for most of the ride.  The sights, smells, and sounds of the woods are experienced by the passengers in the train's open coaches.  During special times of year, an enclosed coach is provided.

Wildlife is abundant on the railway property.  Approximately 60% of trips include views of white-tailed deer, with armadillo, red and gray fox, and squirrel also making frequent appearances.  Bird-watchers especially enjoy the ride, as multitudes of fowl are active in the area.

In addition, several sets of ruins are visible from the train, most dating back to the mid-19th century.  The only extant structure visible is the powder magazine, which has been restored and sits across the river.

Locomotives

The Historic Jefferson Railway operates a small gasoline-powered locomotive named "Critter", built by the Plymouth Locomotive Works.

The railway originally featured two 4-4-0 steam locomotives originally built in 1964 by Crown Metal Products for the Six Gun Territory Amusement park in Silver Springs, Florida, numbered 7 and 4, and named "Robert E. Lee" and "Sam Houston", respectively.  The park had closed in the early 1980s and both engines were sold to the Jefferson Railway in 1985, retaining their names and numbers.  Engine no. 7, "Robert E. Lee", served as the motive power, while the no. 4 was retained as a parts source.  Engine no. 4 was later sold to Warner Bros., who placed the engine on display at Underground Atlanta in Atlanta, Georgia.  In 2017, the no. 4 was sold to the Kirby Family Farm in Williston, Florida in 2017.

Engine no. 7 was likewise sold to the Kirby Family Farm in 2019, and moved the following year.

Special Events
Since 2002, the Historic Jefferson Railway has hosted an annual "Runaway Fright Train", a moving haunted house.  Each October, spooks and spirits descend on the railway with every intention of scaring the pants off of passengers.  The ride takes place after dark, with ultraviolet and strobe light effects.  Live actors and animatronics provide scares, with skits and other decorations along the right-of-way.  Halloween 2005 marked the premier of "Terror on the Bayou", a multi-themed event with a creepy cornfield maze, haunted forest walk, and train ride.  It is still going strong now in 2009. Halloween has proven to be the railway's most popular event, with weekly ridership in the thousands.

Another popular event is the weekly "Ghost Train of Jefferson", which is another ride in the dark, minus the jump scares.  A narrator provides "true" ghost stories as the train cruises with no light provided. Jefferson's reputation as the "most haunted town in Texas" attracts amateur and professional ghost hunters of all ages, and the "Ghost Train" is highly popular.  As of this writing, it is the only regularly scheduled event of its type in the United States.

From Thanksgiving through New Years Day the Rail of Lights Christmas Train and New Years Train light up the piney woods of East Texas. With more than 300,000 Christmas lights the Rail of Lights had become one of the most sought out events on the Arklatex Trail of lights. As well as the number one draw in Jefferson during Christmas.

See also
List of heritage railroads in the United States

References

External links
Official Historic Jefferson Railway website

Heritage railroads in Texas
Jefferson, Texas
Transportation in Marion County, Texas
3 ft gauge railways in the United States
Tourist attractions in Marion County, Texas